William James Roache (born 29 December 1985) is an English actor who is perhaps best known for his roles in connection with his father William Roache. In Coronation Street he played James, the long-lost grandson of Ken Barlow (played by his father). He also played the role of his own father William as a young man in the ITV drama The Road to Coronation Street.

Personal life
Roache was educated at Oxford Brookes University. He is the son of William Roache and the late Sarah Roache and the half-brother of actor Linus Roache.

Career

Roache has appeared on popular television shows such as Cold Blood and Four Seasons before going on to join the cast of Coronation Street alongside his father and older brother as part of a storyline surrounding Ken Barlow and his long-lost son, played by his real-life son Linus. The characters were introduced as part of the soap's fiftieth anniversary. Linus Roache played Roache's father Laurence on Coronation Street which saw the pair's relationship strained by Laurence's attitudes towards James' homosexuality. The storyline was left open, and both executive producer Phil Collinson and William Roache have expressed interest in revisiting the story in the future.

He then appeared in The Road to Coronation Street, playing a younger version of his father William Roache during the time Coronation Street creator Tony Warren was attempting to bring the soap to television.

It was announced on 20 December 2010 that Roache would be joining the cast of Coronation Street full-time in 2011 reprising the role of James Cunningham. He returned on 29 April 2011 and departed in July 2011.

Filmography

References

1985 births
Living people
21st-century English male actors
English male television actors
Alumni of Oxford Brookes University
Place of birth missing (living people)